is a railway station on the Hitahikosan Line in Kokuraminami-ku, Kitakyushu, Japan, operated by Kyushu Railway Company (JR Kyushu).

History
The station opened on 1 April 1915. With the privatization of Japanese National Railways (JNR) on 1 April 1987, the station came under the control of JR Kyushu.

The station became unstaffed from March 2016.

See also
 List of railway stations in Japan

References

External links

  

Railway stations in Fukuoka Prefecture
Buildings and structures in Kitakyushu
Stations of Kyushu Railway Company
Railway stations in Japan opened in 1915